Lindsay Dyring (January 5, 1919 – September 11, 2008) was an Australian rules footballer, who played for the Fitzroy Football Club in the Victorian Football League (VFL).

References

External links

Fitzroy Football Club players
Australian rules footballers from Victoria (Australia)
1919 births
2008 deaths